Cyrtopodion gastrophole, also known commonly as the Farsian spider gecko, Werner's spider gecko, or Werner's bent-toed gecko, is a species of gecko, a lizard in the family Gekkonidae. The species is endemic to southcentral Iran.

References

Further reading
Minton SA Jr (1966). "A Contribution to the Herpetology of West Pakistan". Bull. American Mus. Nat. Hist. 134: 29–184. (Agamura gastropholis, new combination).
Werner F (1917). "Reptilien aus Persien (Provinz Fars) ". Verhandlungen der kaiserlich-königlichen zoologisch-botanischen Gesellschaft in Wien 67: 191–220. (Gymnodactylus gastropholis, new species, pp. 194–196). (in German).

Cyrtopodion
Reptiles described in 1917